Orchid Technology was a privately held company founded by Le Nhon Bui in 1982.

History

1982 to 1984
The company's original flagship product was its PCNet card, a 1 megabit-per-second LAN (networking) card for IBM PCs and clones. Notably, the acronym LAN (Local Area Networking) is the Vietnamese word for "Orchid". Hence, the origin of the company name.

Also in 1982, it introduced the Orchid Graphics Adapter, a graphics board for IBM PC compatible computers. It was intended to provide high resolution (at the time) monochrome graphic abilities to computers limited to text displays. It was aimed at the business market and one of the three first third party graphic boards for PCs.

After this successful product, the company embarked on introducing high-performance add-in cards, most notably the LIM (Lotus, Intel Microsoft standard) which extended DOS out to 1M, Multi-purpose network cards that included RAM, clock, serial printer ports and Network COAX TCP-IP capabilities. Orchid developed its own operating system as well as one of the first 5 OEM's of Novell.  Other products included PC Turbo, TinyTurbo and TurboVGA enhancement cards that included 186 and 286 processors. As the operating systems took on more resources Orchid made a switch back to its roots as PC board manufacturer.

1984 to 1986
From 1984 to 1986 the company switched to an Autocad video board manufacturer. Later, a variety of memory and video cards were introduced.

After 1988
In 1988, Orchid started designing and selling back-plane motherboards under the Privilege Systems Division. However, Orchid could not garner any significant market-share due to stiff competition from motherboard makers Micronics Computers, Inc., Mylex Corporation and American Megatrends Inc.(AMI), the original motherboard brand names in the industry.

1994
In August 1994, Orchid Technology was acquired by motherboard maker Micronics Computers, Inc.
Orchid sold their products through Direct to Fortune companies, OEMs, System Integrators and National Distributors such as Gates/FA, Techdata, Ingram and Micro D.

Graphic Cards

Orchid was known for its Righteous 3D, Fahrenheit Video3D and Kelvin 64 graphics accelerators. They also manufactured an array of multimedia products including SoundWave 32 and GameWave 32 and the award-winning Vidiola line of digital capture and playback systems.

See also
List of defunct graphics chips and card companies
Orchid Graphics Adapter

References

1982 establishments in California
1994 disestablishments in California
1994 mergers and acquisitions
American companies established in 1982
American companies disestablished in 1994
Computer companies established in 1982
Computer companies disestablished in 1994
Defunct computer companies based in California
Defunct computer companies of the United States
Defunct computer hardware companies